Gonzalo Ignacio Abascal Muñoz (born 27 December 1990) is a Chilean former footballer who played as a defender for Pascoe Vale.

Career

A product of Universidad Católica youth system, Abascal started his career with Chilean second tier side Magallanes, helping them reach the 2011 Copa Chile final. Before the 2012 season, Abascal signed for Rangers (Talca) in the Chilean top flight, where he made 3 league appearances and scored 0 goals. On 25 February 2012, he debuted for Rangers (Talca) during a 0–3 loss to Cobreloa. In 2013, Abascal returned to Chilean second tier club Magallanes. After playing for Magallanes, he had decided to retire from football, until he signed for Pascoe Vale in the Australian second tier.

References

External links
 
 
 Gonzalo Abascal at PlaymakerStats

1990 births
Living people
Footballers from Santiago
Chilean footballers
Chilean expatriate footballers
Deportes Magallanes footballers
Rangers de Talca footballers
A.C. Barnechea footballers
Magallanes footballers
Pascoe Vale Football Club players
Primera B de Chile players
Chilean Primera División players
Segunda División Profesional de Chile players
Victorian Premier League players
Association football defenders
Chilean expatriate sportspeople in Australia
Expatriate soccer players in Australia